Many institutions of higher education combine their resources so that they can share information and resources, coordinate research agendas, and afford each other mutual support.

Global

 International Association of Universities (IAU)
 International Federation of Catholic Universities (IFCU)
 Academic Cooperation Association (ACA)
 Agence universitaire de la Francophonie - Universities in French speaking countries and regions (AUF)
 Association of Commonwealth Universities (ACU)
 Mediterranean Universities Union (UNIMED)
 Black Sea Universities Network (BSUN)
 BRICS Universities League
The Association of Southeast Asian Institutions of Higher Learning (ASAIHL)
Venice International University (VIU) 
U7 Alliance of World Universities

Research networks:
 International Alliance of Research Universities (IARU)
 Matariki Network of Universities (MNU)
 PLuS Alliance
 Universitas 21
 Worldwide Universities Network (WUN)
 Global Alliance of Technological Universities 
McDonnell International Scholars Academy (MISA)
Pacific Rim Research Libraries Alliance (PRRLA)
International Association of Scientific and Technological University Libraries (IATUL)

Subject groups:
 International Association of Universities and Colleges of Art, Design and Media (Cumulus)
 Law Schools Global League (LSGL)
Inter-university Consortium for Political and Social Research (ICPSR)
Quantitative Techniques for Economics and Management (QTEM) 
 Association of MBAs (AMBA)
 Association to Advance Collegiate Schools of Business (AACSB)
 Executive MBA Council (EMBAC)
 EFMD Quality Improvement System (EQUIS)
Graduate Business Forum
Global Network for Advanced Management
 Global Business School Network (GBSN)
Partnership in International Management (PIM)
Global Alliance in Management Education (CEMS)
Principles for Responsible Management Education (PRME)
Globally Responsible Leadership Initiative (GRLI)
The Academy of Business in Society (ABIS) 
Association of Universities for Research in Astronomy (AURA)
 Global Engineering Education Exchange(Global E3)
Architecture and Urbanism Student Mobility International Programme (AUSMIP)
The International Consortium of Universities for the Study of Biodiversity and the Environment (iCUBE)
International Institute for Environmental Studies (IIES)

Africa
 Association of African Universities (AAU)
 African Research Universities Alliance (ARUA)

Arctic region
 University of the Arctic (UArctic)

Asia–Pacific
Association of East Asian Research Universities (AEARU)
 Association of Pacific Rim Universities (also includes universities from the Americas) (APRU)
Asia-Oceania Top University League on Engineering (AOTULE)
Asian Science and Technology Pioneering Institutes of Research and Education (Aspire League)
Association of Asia-Pacific Business Schools (AAPBS)
Asia-Pacific Association of International Education (APAIE)
Asian Universities Alliance (AUA)
Association of the Universities of Asia and the Pacific (AUAP)
 Alliance of Asian Liberal Arts Universities (AALAU)
 ASEAN University Network (AUN)
University Mobility in Asia and the Pacific (UMAP)

Australia
 Universities Australia
 Group of Eight (Australian universities) - A group of Australian tertiary institutions intensive in research and comprehensive in general and professional education 
 Australian Business Deans Council (ABDC) 
 Australian Technology Network (ATN)
 Innovative Research Universities (IRU) 
 Regional Universities Network (RUN)

China
 Beijing-Hong Kong Universities Alliance
 C9 League
 Cooperation Consortium of Beijing High Technology Universities (Beijing Tech
 Excellence League
 Guangdong-Hong Kong-Macao University Alliance (GHMUA)
 National Alliance of High-level Local Universities (NAHLU)
 Sino-Spanish University Alliance
 Yangtze Delta Universities Alliance

India 
Institutes of eminence  (IoE)
 Institutions of National Importance (INI)
 Indian Institutes of Technology  (IITs)
 National Institutes of Technology (NITs)
Indian institutes of Information Technology(IIITs)

Japan 
 RU11

Europe
 Balkan Universities Network (BAUNAS)
Coimbra Group (GC)
 Compostela Group of Universities (CGU)
 EAIE
 EUCOR
 EURODOC
 Europaeum
European Consortium of Innovative Universities  (ECIU)
European University Association (EUA)
Euroleague for Life Sciences (ELLS)
EuroTech Universities Alliance
 European Council of Leading Business Schools "ECLBS"
 Guild of European Research-Intensive Universities (The Guild)
IDEA League
 Institutional Network of the Universities from the Capitals of Europe  (UNICA)
 International Research Universities Network  (IRUN)
 League of European Research Universities  (LERU)
 Una Europa
Utrecht Network
 Young European Research Universities Network (YERUN)

France
 Couperin (Consortium unifié des établissements universitaires et de recherche pour l'accès aux publications numériques)

Germany
 U15 (Germany)
 TU9 (Germany)

Italy

Spain
 Xarxa Vives d'Universitats - "Vives Network" - network of Catalan language universities

United Kingdom
Representative groups:
 GuildHE
 Universities UK

Research consortia:
 Eastern ARC (research consortium in eastern England)
 G5 (group of research universities in southeast England)
 GW4 (research consortium in southwest England and Wales) 
 Midlands Innovation (research consortium in the English Midlands)
 N8 Research Partnership (research consortium in northern England)
 SES (research consortium in southeast England)
 White Rose University Consortium (research consortium in Yorkshire)
 MedCity – collaboration between medical research universities in London

Mission groups:
 Cathedrals Group
 MillionPlus
 Russell Group
 University Alliance

Business incubation, spin-out and research commercialisation:
 Midlands Innovation Commercialisation of Research Accelerator (MICRA) – research commercialisation and innovation consortium in the English midlands
 Northern Accelerator – research commercialisation and innovation consortium in northern England
 Northern Gritstone – investment and spin-out consortium in northern England
 SETsquared – business incubator consortium in southern England

Other:
 Wallace Group – international development consortium
 Chartered Association of Business Schools – consortium of UK business schools

The Americas
 Association of American Universities (US and Canada) (AAU)
 Association of Pacific Rim Universities (also includes universities from the Asia–Pacific region) (APRU)

Canada

 Associated Canadian Theological Schools
 Association of Colleges and Universities of the Canadian Francophonie 
 Colleges and Institutes Canada
 Council of Ontario Universities
 Maple League
 Polytechnics Canada
 U15 Group of Canadian Research Universities
 Universities Canada

Mexico
 ANUIES
 AMPEI

United States

 American Council on Education (ACE)
American Association of Community Colleges (AACC)
American Association of State Colleges and Universities (AASCU)
Association of Public and Land-grant Universities (APLU)
National Association of Independent Colleges and Universities (NAICU)
Association of American Colleges and Universities  (AAC&U)
Oak Ridge Associated Universities  (ORAU)
 Great Cities' Universities  (GCU)
 Association of Independent Technological Universities (AITU)

Religious:
 Association of Catholic Colleges and Universities
 Association of Jesuit Colleges and Universities – An organization made up of Jesuit institutions of higher education in the United States

Subject groups:
 Association of American Law Schools (AALS)
 Association of American Medical Colleges (AAMC)

References

Associations and alliances